The 2020 presidential campaign of John Delaney, the former U.S. representative who represented Maryland's 6th congressional district from 2013 to 2019, was announced to the public on July 28, 2017. Delaney was the first prominent Democrat to announce a campaign for the 2020 U.S. presidential election, far earlier than other candidates. If elected, Delaney would have been the first Marylander to serve as President of the United States, and the second Catholic, after John F Kennedy.

Delaney promotes himself as a centrist, and a moderate, and believes that the Democratic Party needs to be a big tent to bridge partisan and national divisions. He harshly criticized Donald Trump for being divisive among other issues. From January 25, 2020, Delaney did not reach greater than 2% in a national poll. Delaney suspended his campaign on January 31, 2020, after making an announcement on social media.

Background
Delaney is a three-term congressman, representing Maryland's 6th district. He has a background as a businessman and entrepreneur.

Before Delaney announced that he was running for the presidency, he was considered a potential candidate for Maryland's 2018 gubernatorial election.

Delaney had said that he began considering a presidential run following Hillary Clinton's surprise defeat by Republican nominee Donald Trump in the 2016 election.

In May 2017, Chris Matthews, host of MSNBC's program Hardball and the husband of Maryland Democratic Party Chair Kathleen Matthews, said that Delaney had set up an office in Maryland that he speculated might be for a presidential run. At the time, Delaney's office denied this speculation. Later that month, Delaney said, "I am not running for president."

Campaign announcement
Delaney launched his campaign announcement with the publication of an op-ed column on the Washington Posts website, which coincided with the launch of a campaign Twitter account and YouTube account, as well as a Tumblr account, on which he posted a five-minute video outlining his plans. Rumors of Delaney's campaign arose the day before the publication of his op-ed.

In order to focus on his run for the presidency, Delaney did not run for reelection to Congress in 2018.

It is highly unusual for a serious presidential candidate to announce so early. Previously Republican Pete du Pont had held the record of the earliest announcement; du Pont announced his campaign for the 1988 election in 1986, 615 days before the start of the Iowa caucuses.

Delaney had said that launching his campaign at such an early date was in order to gain name recognition, and to elevate his national stature. Voicing his objection to playing coy about his intentions in an interview with Business Insider, Delaney said,

Delaney has also said of his strategy,  In another interview, Delaney said of his campaign's approach, 

Delaney recognized that his campaign faced difficult odds, saying,

Campaigning

Early campaigning

2017
Delaney said that he planned to begin his campaign by touring critical swing states. During a long congressional recess in August 2017, he began touring the country, starting in Iowa. In Iowa, he met with Democratic activists, interviewed potential campaign staff, and attended the  Iowa State Fair with his family.

In late August, Delaney attended a New Hampshire Senate fundraiser in Brentwood, New Hampshire. While his visits to New Hampshire came incredibly early for a declared candidate (twenty-nine months before the state's primary), several other potential (undeclared) candidates were making similarly-timed visits to the state.  Commenting on this, Delaney said of his visit,

Delaney said that he hoped to take advantage of other prospective candidates being reticent about their ambitions. He suspected that he would be solitary in the field of declared candidates for the Democratic candidates for at least one and a half years. He believes it will be advantageous to be the only declared candidate at a time when voters already have an appetite to hear from alternatives to the incumbent presidential administration. Delaney said,

On September 17, the campaign announced that Terry Lierman would serve as a co-chair. Lierman had previously  served as the treasurer of Martin O'Malley's 2016 presidential campaign and the national finance co-chair of Howard Dean's 2004 presidential campaign. On September 20, the campaign announced that it had hired Iowa political consultant John Davis as a senior advisor.

In September, Delaney made his first trip to South Carolina, and his second trip to Iowa. By the end of 2017, Delaney said that he had held a combined 90 events in Iowa and New Hampshire.

2018
By late January 2018, Delaney reported to have already held "100 events on the ground in Iowa and New Hampshire". He declared that he intended to hold a total of 400 events in 2018.

In February, Delaney ran his first television advertisement in Iowa, touting his bipartisanship. The advertisement first aired during the broadcast of Super Bowl LII.

In early April, Delaney began running ads in Iowa critical of the negative impacts that the Trump tariffs were expected to have on Iowa's farmers. Later that month, Delaney made his seventh campaign trip to the state of New Hampshire.

By the middle of May, Delaney said that he had made a total of 19 trips and held a total of 200 campaign stops in the states of Iowa and New Hampshire. He had thus far been focusing his campaign efforts predominately in those two states, as well as in South Carolina, another early-primary state. Delaney also campaigned on behalf of candidates running in the 2018 mid-terms, including those running in congressional and local elections in the states of Ohio and Maryland.

Prominent conservative columnist George F. Will wrote a column for The Washington Post in November 2018, in which he touted Delaney's blue collar roots and opined that Democrats should consider nominating Delaney if they are serious about defeating President Donald Trump in the 2020 election.

2019

By early 2019, as the field of Democratic candidates began to grow, Delaney had been firmly placed as a more centrist candidate. Delaney also garnered endorsements from four Iowa Democratic County Chairs. He was the first candidate to receive endorsements from Iowa Democratic Party county chairs. Delaney also expanded his campaign, opening seven offices in Iowa and his first in New Hampshire.

He held his first town hall on March 8 at WMUR TV in Manchester, New Hampshire, and had his second town-hall on March 10 on CNN in Austin, Texas.

Delaney had a standout moment during a debate in Detroit, which resulted in a fundraising surge.

He did not qualify for any debates held after the second one. He blamed his inability to gain support on not being in the debates.

Platform/positions

In his campaign, Delaney promoted himself as, "a leading voice in Congress on 21st century jobs, education, veterans issues, and infrastructure."

In the op-ed announcing his candidacy, Delaney wrote,

Delaney believes that the Democratic Party needs to be a big tent. He intended to appeal to voters that are dissatisfied with the increasingly radicalized stances which both parties have adopted. A centrist, Delaney touts his own bipartisan credentials as evidence of his ability to transcend the partisan divide. Delaney strongly supported "Force the Vote" throughout the primary contest. Delaney proclaims himself to be a progressive interested in creating "real–not political–progress." Delaney views bipartisan cooperation as being more important than progressive goals.

Delaney promised that, if elected president, he would act as a unifier, acting on a bipartisan-only basis in his first 100-day to advance existing bipartisan measures. He also promised that, as president, he would engage in quarterly debates with congress.

, as a congressman Delaney had voted in support of President Trump's positions 34.4% of the time, according to FiveThirtyEight's assessment.

Delaney has criticized Donald Trump for, amongst other things, being divisive, saying,

Endorsements

Campaign finances
Delaney has said that he won't accept any assistance from political action committees.

By the end of June, Delaney's campaign had raised more than $270,000 in funds, including more than $60,000 in individual contributions. By the end of September, the campaign had raised more than $750,000 in funds, and had more than $300,000 in unspent funds.

Delaney self-funded much of his campaign. In total, Delaney gave his campaign $1,169,076 of his own money in contributions, and further loaned his campaign committee $25,245,000 of his own money. Only $2,582,781.9 in contributions were raised from contributions by other individuals. An additional $166,000 came from other committees.

See also
 Democratic Party presidential primaries, 2020
 2020 United States presidential election

References

External links
 Campaign website

Delaney